Mikuszewo  is a village in the administrative district of Gmina Miłosław, within Września County, Greater Poland Voivodeship, in west-central Poland. Mikuszewo is situated on the Vistula Spit, at the mouth of the Vistula.

References

Mikuszewo
Gmina Miłosław